Cannon Mountain is an 8,638 ft (2,633 m) mountain summit located in Chelan County of Washington state. Cannon Mountain is part of The Enchantments, within the Alpine Lakes Wilderness. Cannon Mountain belongs to the Stuart Range which is subset of the Cascade Range. Cannon Mountain is situated one mile north of Enchantment Peak. The nearest higher peak is Dragontail Peak,  to the southwest. Precipitation runoff drains into Icicle Creek, a tributary of the Wenatchee River.

Geology
The Alpine Lakes Wilderness features some of the most rugged topography in the Cascade Range with craggy peaks and ridges, deep glacial valleys, and granite walls spotted with over 700 mountain lakes. Geological events occurring many years ago created the diverse topography and drastic elevation changes over the Cascade Range leading to the various climate differences.

The history of the formation of the Cascade Mountains dates back millions of years ago to the late Eocene Epoch. With the North American Plate overriding the Pacific Plate, episodes of volcanic igneous activity persisted.  In addition, small fragments of the oceanic and continental lithosphere called terranes created the North Cascades about 50 million years ago.

During the Pleistocene period dating back over two million years ago, glaciation advancing and retreating repeatedly scoured the landscape leaving  deposits of rock debris. The last glacial retreat in the Alpine Lakes area began about 14,000 years ago and was north of the Canada–US border by 10,000 years ago. The "U"-shaped cross section of the river valleys are a result of that recent glaciation. Uplift and faulting in combination with glaciation have been the dominant processes which have created the tall peaks and deep valleys of the Alpine Lakes Wilderness area.

Climate

Most weather fronts originate in the Pacific Ocean, and travel east toward the Cascade Mountains. As fronts approach, they are forced upward by the peaks of the Cascade Range, causing them to drop their moisture in the form of rain or snowfall onto the Cascades (Orographic lift). As a result, the Cascades experience high precipitation, especially during the winter months in the form of snowfall. During winter months, weather is usually cloudy, but, due to high pressure systems over the Pacific Ocean that intensify during summer months, there is often little or no cloud cover during the summer.

See also

List of peaks of the Alpine Lakes Wilderness

References

External links
 Weather forecast: Cannon Mountain
Alpine Lakes Wilderness (Okanogan-Wenatchee National Forest) U.S. Forest Service

Cannon Mountain
Cannon Mountain
Cannon Mountain
North American 2000 m summits